Ronald E. Feiereisel (August 6, 1931 – January 28, 2000) was an American basketball player and coach.

Playing career
A 6'3" guard, Feiereisel starred at DePaul Academy in Chicago before playing for Ray Meyer at DePaul University from 1950 to 1953. As a senior, he was an honorable mention All-American after averaging 18 points per game.

Following a two year stint with the Army, Feiereisel signed with the Minneapolis Lakers of the NBA in August 1955. After a good showing during the preseason, he was released by the Lakers in end of November the same year after appearing in 10 of Lakers' first 11 regular season games where he averaged 3.0 points per game.

Coaching career
Feiereisel began his coaching career with DePaul Academy, first as an assistant and later as head coach, and led the school to the 1959 Chicago Catholic League title. After a stint as an assistant to Ray Meyer, Feiereisel moved on to St. Viator High School, where he became the school's first boys' basketball coach.  He then became a referee for the American Basketball Association and Big Ten Conference.

In 1980, he returned to DePaul to become their women's basketball coach. Over four seasons, he posted a 61–57 record.

Death
Feiereisel died on January 28, 2000, aged 68, at Northwestern Memorial Hospital in Chicago.

References

External links
NBA statistics at Basketball Reference

1931 births
2000 deaths
All-American college men's basketball players
American men's basketball players
American women's basketball coaches
Basketball players from Illinois
DePaul Blue Demons men's basketball players
DePaul Blue Demons women's basketball coaches
Minneapolis Lakers draft picks
Minneapolis Lakers players
Shooting guards
Small forwards